Jason Stockwood (born July 1970) is an English businessman who is current football chairman and joint majority shareholder of Grimsby Town.

Having graduated with a Bachelor of Philosophy (BPhil), he moved into the travel business and has previously held roles as the managing director of Travelocity, non-executive of Skyscanner and commercial roles with lastminute.com. He is also the former international managing director of dating website Match.com. In 2010 he joined Simply Business, a tech start up in financial services where he was group CEO.

Early life
Stockwood was born in Grimsby and attended Tollbar Academy in the village of in New Waltham, near Grimsby. Stockwood comes from a working class family; his mother, a single parent who worked three jobs to keep four sons clothed and fed. Aged 15, he worked as a waiter at Winter Gardens in Cleethorpes and worked on Grimsby docks for a few months. After leaving school, Stockwood went on a kibbutz in Israel, he went on to work at Walt Disney World in Florida and as a holiday rep in Greece, before studying full-time in 1992 at University in Bolton.

Stockwood is a lifelong supporter of his home town football club Grimsby Town; in 1979 he was attended his first game against Sheffield Wednesday. He was a ballboy in November 1984 for The Mariners at Blundell Park in a fixture against Wolverhampton Wanderers.

Business career
He graduated with a degree in philosophy from the University of Bolton in 1995, and has used his studies to form the ideas that have made his companies a success. Having spent time working in the travel industry as managing director of Travelocity Business, non-executive at Skyscanner and commercial roles with lastminute.com, Stockwood went on to become the international managing director of dating website match.com.

From there, he has gone on to come CEO and then vice-chairman of Simply Business, a business insurance provider which has gained recognition for its treatment of its employees. Simply Business was voted as the number one ‘Best Place to Work’ in the UK by The Sunday Times in both 2015 and 2016, with Stockwood winning the overall Best Leader award in the latter year. The company's awards led to it being accredited as a certified B Corporation. Simply Business raised capital through a number of private equity investors, most notably from New York based Aquiline Private Equity. It was eventually sold to The Travelers Companies in 2017 for $500m.

He is an investor in early stage technology companies through 53 Degrees Capital. Notable investments include Olio, Chiaro, Be My Eyes and Beam.

Since 2019 he has been the Chair of the board raising the money to build the Horizon Youth Zone in Grimsby

In 2020 he was invited to become a Transformational Leadership Fellow at The Blavatnik School of Government, The University of Oxford.

Since 2021 he has written a number of articles for The Guardian newspaper relating to football, politics and culture.

Football ownership
Stockwood was announced as part of a consortium, led by London businessman Tom Shutes, which was interested in buying out John Fenty's majority control of Grimsby Town. Shutes later pulled out for personal reasons, which prompted Stockwood and other consortium member Andrew Pettit to form a company called 1878 Partners, which on 5 May successfully completed the takeover of the club with Stockwood named as chairman. He wrote an article in The Guardian detailing why.

On June 5, 2022 Grimsby Town FC were promoted back to the EFL after just one year in the National League and 13 months after Stockwood and Pettit took ownership of the club.

Bibliography

 Reboot: A Blueprint for Happy, Human Business in the Digital Age (2018)

References

1970 births
Living people
People from Grimsby
20th-century English businesspeople
21st-century English businesspeople
Grimsby Town F.C.
English football chairmen and investors
Grimsby Town F.C. non-playing staff
Alumni of the University of Bolton
Harvard Business School alumni
English non-fiction writers
English male non-fiction writers